Santai County (formerly known as Tungchwanfu) is a county under the administration of the prefecture-level city of Mianyang, in the northeast of Sichuan Province of China.

Population density 553 per square kilometers.

During the late 19th and first half of 20th century, Tungchwan was one of the mission centres of the Friends' Foreign Mission Association. Quaker-affiliated hospital, meeting house, boys' school and girls' boarding school were built during this period (see Quakerism in Sichuan).

Climate

References

External links
Official website of Santai County government

 
County-level divisions of Sichuan
Mianyang